Frank Reed may refer to:
Frank Reed (singer) (1954–2014), lead singer of the vocal group The Chi-Lites
Frank Reed (American football) (born 1954), American football player
Frank M. Reed (1861–?), Wisconsin state assemblyman
Frank Reed (softball), head coach of the Chattanooga Lady Mocs softball team

See also
Frank Reid (disambiguation)
Frank Reade, fictional character